Ernest Shufflebotham (17 September 1908 – 6 May 1984) was an English-born potter and designer active from the 1930s - 1950s.

History
He was trained by Keith Murray, a New Zealand-born ceramic designer, while at Wedgwood in England. He developed into a skilled thrower and was a key interpreter of Murray's designs. In 1948 Shufflebotham was brought to New Zealand by Crown Lynn along with a number of other designers including Frank Carpay to work in the company's 'Specials Department'. He was employed to produce more upmarket works that would expand the market for Crown Lynn ceramics. He was one of the few professional throwers in New Zealand during the period from his arrival in 1948 to his departure in 1957.

He continued the style used by Murray and would throw the clay on a pottery wheel to create the vase. His assistant would then turn it on a lathe to produce the indentations. The matt white finish of his work was made possible by Crown Lynn's 1948 development of a formula based on halloysitic clay from Matauri Bay. These works were variations on those he had thrown at Wedgwood.

His work has influenced New Zealand potters, in particular the potter John Parker.

List of works
Works in the collection of the Museum of New Zealand Te Papa Tongarewa

References

 Lloyd Jenkins, D. (2004) At Home: a Century of New Zealand Design. Auckland: Random House.
 New Zealand Pottery and Collectables Forum

New Zealand ceramicists
1908 births
1984 deaths
20th-century ceramists
British emigrants to New Zealand